The Long Way Home is the seventh studio album by Canadian country music artist Terri Clark. The album was released on September 1, 2009 in Canada and through digital retailers in United States and was released to other American retailers on October 20. It produced four singles: "Gypsy Boots," "If You Want Fire," "A Million Ways to Run" and "You Tell Me." Additionally, "The One You Love" was originally released on her fifth studio album, Pain to Kill, but was re-recorded for The Long Way Home to include Vince Gill on background vocals. Clark previously recorded ‘Tough with Me’ and ‘Gypsy Boots’ in 2007 for her unreleased debut for BNA records.

Track listing

Personnel

 Jason Barry – acoustic guitar, electric guitar
 Terri Clark – acoustic guitar, resonator guitar, lead vocals, background vocals
 Gary Craig – drums
 John Diamond – bass guitar, upright bass
 Stuart Duncan – fiddle, mandolin
 Chris Dunn – trombone
 Jeneé Fleenor – background vocals
 Shannon Forrest – drums
 Paul Franklin – dobro, steel guitar
 Vince Gill – vocals on "The One You Love"
 Kenny Greenberg – electric guitar

 Steve Herman – trumpet
 Wes Hightower – background vocals
 John Hobbs – Hammond B-3 organ, Wurlitzer
 Jim Horn – saxophone
 Mike Johnson – dobro, steel guitar
 Paul Leim – drums
 Brent Mason – electric guitar
 Johnny Reid – vocals on "You Tell Me"
 Bryan Sutton – banjo, mandolin
 Jonathan Yudkin – strings

Chart performance
'Album

Singles

References

2009 albums
Capitol Records albums
Terri Clark albums